Marginellopsis serrei is a species of very small sea snail, a marine gastropod mollusk or micromollusk in the family Granulinidae.

Description
The length of the shell attains 1 mm.

Distribution
This species occurs in the Caribbean Sea, the Gulf of Mexico and the Lesser Antilles.

References

 Riedel F. (2000). Berliner Geowiss. Abhandlungen Reihe E Palaeobiologie ser. E, 32 : 1–240
 Rosenberg, G., F. Moretzsohn, and E. F. García. 2009. Gastropoda (Mollusca) of the Gulf of Mexico, Pp. 579–699 in Felder, D.L. and D.K. Camp (eds.), Gulf of Mexico–Origins, Waters, and Biota. Biodiversity. Texas A&M Press, College Station, Texas
 Boyer F. (2017). Révision de l'organisation supra-spécifique des gastéropodes granuliniformes. Xenophora Taxonomy. 16: 25-38

External links
 Bavay A. (1911). Une marginellidée nouvelle de Cuba. Bulletin du Muséum National d'Histoire Naturelle. 17(4): 240-243

Granulinidae
Gastropods described in 1911